"Just Once" is a 1981 single released from Quincy Jones' album The Dude on A&M Records. The song features James Ingram on vocals, and reached number 17 on the Billboard chart in the summer of 1981. Ingram's singing was nominated for Best Male Pop Vocal Performance at the 1982 Grammy Awards.

History and composition
On a television program interview, Ingram stated that this song was a $50 demo done by ATV Music, composed by Barry Mann and Cynthia Weil. Quincy Jones called back and wanted Ingram to sing on his album.

The song is composed originally in the key of C major. The bridge modulates to the key of A flat major, moves to B major, then to D major for the final chorus, finally ending in B major (the song’s dominant chord) for the coda, representing the song’s sad ending.

Charts

Popular culture
The song was featured prominently over the final scene of the 1982 film The Last American Virgin.

References

1981 songs
1981 singles
Quincy Jones songs
James Ingram songs
A&M Records singles
Pop ballads
Contemporary R&B ballads
Songs written by Barry Mann
Songs with lyrics by Cynthia Weil